Mumble rap (often referred to as "SoundCloud rap") is a loosely defined microgenre of hip hop that largely spread on the online audio distribution platform SoundCloud in the 2010s. The generally critically leveled term implies a mumbling or unclear vocal delivery by artists, and has been used to describe rappers who do not share the genre's traditional emphasis on meaningful lyricism. The phrase "SoundCloud rappers" has also been used in a manner coextensive with "mumble rappers", referring to the artists' music distribution on SoundCloud. 

Mumble rap may create the illusion of fast and skilled vocal delivery due to its unclear nature; for example, the music of Young Thug has been seen as using this illusion. While the term has hence been taken as derogatory, some artists have reappropriated the term and have defended the style as a new phase in the evolution of the genre.

Style and etymology 

The term "mumble rap" was first used in 2014 by VladTV battle rap journalist Michael Hughes, in an interview with battle rapper Loaded Lux about the style's emergence in mainstream hip hop. There is disagreement over who first rapped in such a style, although its creation has been attributed to rappers such as Gucci Mane, Chief Keef, and most notably Future, whose 2012 single "Tony Montana" is often cited as the first mumble rap song; however, there have been sources dating as far back as October 2011 of even older releases by other artists. The term was first used to describe rappers whose lyrics were unclear, but the use of the term has expanded to include rappers that Reddit posters and YouTube commenters claim generally put little emphasis on lyricism or lyrical quality. Some have claimed that artists such as Das EFX and Fu-Schnickens rapped in a similar style years before the term was created. "Mumble rappers" generally rap about drugs, sex, money, jewelry, designer clothing, and partying. Rappers labelled as "mumble rappers" also tend to use the "aye" flow, where they add words such as "yeah", "aye" and "uh" to the start or end of their lines.

"Mumble rap" is nearly exclusively used as a derogatory term in reference to a perceived incoherence of the artist's lyrics. Oscar Harold of the Cardinal Times stated that "mumble rap" is misleading, arguing that the rappers such as Future rely more upon pop melodies and vocal effects, such as Auto-Tune, than mumbling. Justin Charity, a staff writer at The Ringer, argues that the term is unnecessarily reductive and does not in fact refer to one specific type of rapping. He wrote that many of the artists often scapegoated in conversations about the subgenre do not actually mumble, which "is the red flag that the term isn't a useful subcategorization."

There are disputes as to whether some rappers are mumble rappers or not. There is also conflation between mumble/SoundCloud rap and other new generation-led evolutions or niches such as trap and cloud rap. The Cleveland Plain Dealer's Troy L. Smith writes that 21 Savage unfairly gets classified as a mumble rapper.

SoundCloud rap scene 

In 2017, music critic Jon Caramanica of The New York Times opined that SoundCloud rap "in the last year has become the most vital and disruptive new movement in hip-hop".  Todd Moscowitz, the founder of Alamo Records, called the scene a "lo-fi movement" noting the heavily distorted bass and intentional lack of polish in the sound. When Ski Mask the Slump God discussed the genre's lo-fi sound and recording techniques, he noted, "It was like the worst recording set up, [but] you could set it up anywhere and that was the wave we were on.... The raw energy of that – the distortion – is our speciality and we used that to our advantage." Spin noted that the SoundCloud company has not been able to leverage the popularity of SoundCloud rap to improve its financial problems. In January 2019, citing the deaths of American rappers Lil Peep in 2017 and XXXTentacion in 2018, Lil Xan's entry into rehab, and 6ix9ine's legal troubles, Stephen Witt of Rolling Stone magazine argued that the SoundCloud rap wave of the past few years was now in decline. The death of Juice Wrld in 2019 has been described as the death of Soundcloud rap.

Reception

Criticism
Rappers who have voiced discontent with mumble rap include J. Cole, Hopsin, Chris Webby, Logic, Russ, Joyner Lucas, and Eminem. On his album Kamikaze, Eminem criticized multiple "mumble rappers" after declaring that "The boom bap is coming back with an axe to mumble rap" in the Royce da 5'9" song "Caterpillar". Eminem's diss track "Killshot", which was targeted at Machine Gun Kelly, included a line where he pejoratively called MGK a mumble rapper. Noted rap artist Pete Rock prominently criticized the style for abandoning hip-hop tradition. In music critic Robert Christgau's opinion, "SoundCloud rap is at least as afflicted as any other kind of hip hop with sexist rhetoric."

Praise
In defense of the style, Justin Charity of The Ringer suggested that the debate is "really about discomfort with how a generation of young musicians has chosen to use their voices in strange, unprecedented ways, and against the wishes of their parents and forefathers." The Guardian compared the style to the first wave of punk, noting a shared "sonic simplicity, gleeful inanity and sense of transgression." The Vibe linked mumble rap to earlier forms of hip-hop, as well as jazz scatting. For The Conversation, Adam de Paor-Evans disputed the idea that mumble rap is a reflection of laziness, suggesting instead that it is an accurate reflection of boredom resulting from the immediacy and speed of contemporary cultural life." Red Bull Music Academy stated that "however they're labeled – SoundCloud rap, emo-trap, mumble rap – one thing's for sure: these rappers are forging new paths, once again pushing the boundaries of what rap is, who it's for and how it's distributed."

Rap pioneer Grandmaster Caz expressed acceptance of the style, stating "It's all good [...] they're a different generation, they do a different thing, they have a different agenda and their influences come from different places." Funk pioneer George Clinton of Parliament-Funkadelic declared himself a listener of mumble rap, stating "we try to pay attention to whatever the new music is that gets on your nerves." Podcaster and television host The Kid Mero dismisses criticisms of the style, stating: "sonically if your shit is wack, why am I gonna listen to what you gotta say? If I turn it on and the beat is kind of annoying, I'm not gonna sit through that just to hear you say ‘lyrical, metaphysical, giftical...’"

See also

 Asemic writing
 Alternative hip hop
 Atlanta hip hop
 Chicago hip hop
 Chicano rap
 Chopper
 Cloud rap
 Crunkcore
 Emo rap
 Footwork
 Horrorcore
 List of hip hop genres
 List of mumble rap artists
 Memphis rap
 Mexican hip hop
 Romany hip hop
 Scat singing
 Southern hip hop
 Trap
 Weird SoundCloud

References

Hip hop genres
2010s in music
Microgenres
2010s fads and trends
African-American music
American styles of music
2010s in American music
Music of Atlanta
2010s neologisms